Manual of the Mustard Seed Garden, sometimes known as , is a printed manual of Chinese painting compiled during the early-Qing Dynasty. Many renowned later Chinese painters, like Qi Baishi, began their drawing lessons with the manual.  It is an important early example of colour printing.

The work was commissioned by Shen Xinyou, son-in-law of the famous playwright Li Yu, whose mansion in Lanxi, Zhejiang province was known as Jieziyuan, or Mustard Seed Garden. Shen possessed the teaching materials of Li Liufang (李流芳), a painter of the late-Ming dynasty, and commissioned Wáng Gài, Wáng Shī, Wáng Niè and Zhū Shēng to edit and expand those materials with the aim of producing a manual for landscape painting. Li Yu, as the publisher, wrote a preface for this part. The first fascicle deals with the general principles of landscape painting, the second the painting of trees, the third that of hills and stones, the fourth that of people and houses, and the fifth comprises the selected works of great landscape painters.

The volume also entered Edo period Japan, where woodblock printed copies became relatively easily accessible in all the major cities; the Mustard Seed Garden Manual came to be used by a great many Japanese artists and was a major element in the training of artists and the development of Edo period painting.

Two more parts, which deal with the painting of flora and fauna, were produced by Wang and his two brothers and published 1701. Shen promised a fourth part, but never published it. A fourth part, which deals with portraits, was produced by some quick profit-seeking publisher, though. Chao Xun (1852–1917), dissatisfied with the fake, produced his own sequel, as well as carefully reproduced the first three volumes. Reprints of the first three volumes are usually based on Chao's reproduction.

An English translation of the work, The Tao of Painting – A study of the ritual disposition of Chinese painting. With a translation of the Chieh Tzu Yuan Hua Chuan or Mustard Seed Garden Manual of Painting 1679–1701, was made by Mai-mai Sze and published in New York in 1956.

References
Zhongguo da baike quanshu. First Edition. Beijing; Shanghai: Zhongguo da baike quanshu chubanshe. 1980–1993.

External links
 Mustard Seed Garden, a Chinese Painter's Manual ~ at Internet Archive.
 KIAI-TSEU-YUAN HOUA TCHOUAN [Jieziyuan huazhuan]. Les Enseignements de la Peinture du Jardin grand comme un Grain de Moutarde. Encyclopédie de la peinture chinoise Traduction et commentaires par Raphaël PETRUCCI (1910), at les Classiques des sciences sociales, l'Université du Québec.

Chinese painting
Books about visual art
Qing dynasty literature